Zilia Radikovna Batyrshina (born 23 July 1999) is a Russian sport shooter of Tatar descent. She represents Russia at the 2020 Summer Olympics in Tokyo.

References

1999 births
Living people
Volga Tatars
Tatar sportspeople
Tatar people of Russia
Russian female sport shooters
Shooters at the 2020 Summer Olympics
Olympic shooters of Russia
Sportspeople from Tatarstan
21st-century Russian women